George Mallia (born 10 October 1978 in Sliema, Malta) is a retired professional footballer who last played for Maltese Premier League side Qormi FC as a midfielder.

Playing career
George made his debut with Sliema Wanderers in the Maltese Premier League in the season 1995–1996. In the season 1998-1999 he joined Floriana. In 2002-2003 he joined Birkirkara and became one of the best players on the team. At the end of the 2009–2010 season with Birkirkara FC (where he won the Maltese Premier League for the second time with Birkirkara), he signed a deal with Qormi FC.  George is a national team regular player and has also played at all levels with the Youth National Team.

International career
Mallia made his international debut in 1997, while he was still playing for Sliema. He earned himself 62 caps, and has scored a total of 6 goals for the Malta national football team. He is remembered for his fantastic goal against Moldova, where the game ended 1-1 (away), as well as an away goal against Denmark. In an August 2005 friendly against Northern Ireland Mallia had an injury time penalty saved by Maik Taylor; had he scored it would have given Malta an unlikely win.

International goals
Scores and results list Malta's goal tally first.

References

External links
 George Mallia at MaltaFootball.com
 
 

1978 births
Living people
Maltese footballers
Malta international footballers
Sliema Wanderers F.C. players
Floriana F.C. players
Birkirkara F.C. players
Qormi F.C. players
People from Sliema
Association football midfielders